Finding Merlin: The Truth Behind The Legend is a 2007 book by Scottish advocate Adam Ardrey, in which he puts forward the theory that Merlin was a Scottish druid, politician and scholar. The book claims that Merlin was born in 540 CE in Cadzow (Hamilton), and died circa 618  in Drumelzier, near Dunipace. The book also states that one of Merlin's main antagonists was Saint Mungo.

External links 
 news.bbc.co.uk
 Author interview at theoverlookpress.blogspot.com

Scottish books
2007 in Scotland
2007 non-fiction books
Works based on Merlin
Arthurian literature